Libhošť is a municipality and village in Nový Jičín District in the Moravian-Silesian Region of the Czech Republic. It has about 1,700 inhabitants.

History
The first written mention of Libhošť is from 1411, however the village maybe existed already in 1230.

In 1976 Libhošť was joined to Nový Jičín. On 1 January 2011 the village separated from Nový Jičín and became an independent municipality again.

References

Villages in Nový Jičín District
Moravian Wallachia